Liu Jianxu (2 October 1892 – 22 March 1978), art-name Huixian (恢先), courtesy name Ziyang (子養), was a KMT general from Liling, Hunan. He participated in the Battle of Shanghai in 1937 in command of the 10th Army Group of the East Chekiang Garrison Sector. He went to Hong Kong in 1949 before immigrating to Brazil in 1951.

National Revolutionary Army generals from Hunan
1892 births
1978 deaths
People from Zhuzhou
People of the Northern Expedition